Longchang Temple is a Buddhist temple located on Mount Baohua, in Baohua Town of Jurong, Jiangsu, China. It is the an important monastery in the Chinese Buddhist Vinaya tradition. The temple is renowned not only for its Copper Hall and Beamless Halls, but also for the 400-years-old ginkgo trees.

History

The temple was originally built by monk Baozhi in 502 as "Qianhua Temple", under the Liang dynasty (502–557).

In the reign of Wanli Emperor of the Ming dynasty (1368–1644), the emperor bestowed a set of Chinese Buddhist canon on the temple and renamed it "Huguo Shenghua Longchang Temple", more commonly known as "Longchang Temple".

During the Qing dynasty (1644–1911), Kangxi Emperor and Qianlong Emperor came to the temple to worship Buddha and offer incenses, which elevated its position and attracted more people to offer incenses.

Longchang Temple has been inscribed as a National Key Buddhist Temple in Han Chinese Area in 1983.

In March 2013, the Copper Hall and Beanless Halls were designated as "Major National Historical and Cultural Sites in Jiangsu" by the State Council of China.

Architecture

Copper Hall
In 1605, in the late Ming dynasty (1368–1644), Empress Dowager Xiaoding donated two thousand taels of gold to establish the Copper Hall. Statue of Guanyin are enshrined in the hall.

Beamless Halls
The Beamless Halls was also built in 1605. They situated at both sides of the Copper Hall. The left Beamless Hall enshrining the statue of Manjushri and the right Beamless Hall enshrining the statue of Samantabhadra. It is called "Beamless Hall" since it is built without pillars or columns.

Hall of Ordination
The Hall of Ordination or Jietan Hall is the most important hall in the temple. In 1705, in the 43rd year of Kangxi period in the Qing dynasty (1644–1911), master Yuejian designed the stone carving ordination altar.

Mahavira Hall
The statue modeled the statue of Tian Tan Buddha. It was presented by Baolian Temple in Hong Kong.

Television
In June 2015, Longchang Temple served as a shooting location for the CCTV documentary One Hundred Buddhist Temples in China.

References

Bibliography
 

Buddhist temples in Zhenjiang
Buildings and structures in Zhenjiang
Tourist attractions in Zhenjiang
17th-century establishments in China
17th-century Buddhist temples
Religious buildings and structures completed in 1605